The 2011–12 season was Inverness Caledonian Thistle's second consecutive season in the Scottish Premier League, having competed in the league since their promotion in the 2009–10 season. Inverness also competed in the League Cup and the Scottish Cup.

Summary
Inverness finished tenth in the Scottish Premier League. They reached the fifth round of the Scottish Cup where they were beaten by semifinalists Celtic. They were beaten in the second round of the League Cup by lower league opposition Ayr United.

Results and fixtures

Pre season

Scottish Premier League

Scottish League Cup

Scottish Cup

Player statistics

Captains

Squad
Last updated 13 May 2012

|}

Disciplinary record
Includes all competitive matches.
Last updated 13 May 2012

Team statistics

League table

Hat-tricks

Transfers
Inverness' first significant move in the close season was to release 10 first team players. Two players also returned from loan back to their parent club. Chris Hogg was originally released by Caley Thistle at end of the season but later re-signed.

Players in

Players out

References

Inverness Caledonian Thistle F.C. seasons
I